This list of the Paleozoic life of Kentucky contains the various prehistoric life-forms whose fossilized remains have been reported from within the US state of Kentucky and are between 538.8 and 252.17 million years of age.

A

 †Abatocrinus
 †Abatocrinus grandis
 †Abatocrinus steropes
 †Abatocrinus n. sp. – informal
  †Abrotocrinus
 †Abrotocrinus coreyi
 †Abrotocrinus debrae
 †Abrotocrinus manus – tentative report
 †Abrotocrinus springeri
 †Abrotocrinus unicus
 †Achatella
 †Achistrum
 †Achistrum brownwoodensis
 †Achistrum ludwigi
 †Achistrum monochordata
 †Achistrum nicholsoni
 †Acidaspis
 †Acidaspsis
 †Acinophyllum
 †Acinophyllum davisi
 †Aclisina
 †Aclisina golconda
 †Acolocrinus
 †Acolocrinus hydraulicus
 †Acratia
 † Acrophyllum
 †Acrophyllum clarki
 †Acrophyllum conigerum
 †Actinoceras
 †Actinoceras altopontense – type locality for species
 †Actinoceras kentuckiense – type locality for species
  †Actinocrinites
 †Actinocrinites eximius
 †Actinocrinites gibsoni
 †Actinocrinites jugosus
 †Actinocrinites scitulus
 †Adinocrinus
 †Adinocrinus nodosus
 †Aerocortex
 †Aerocortex kentuckiensis
  †Agaricocrinus
   †Agaricocrinus americanus
 †Agaricocrinus crassus
 †Agaricocrinus inflatus – tentative report
 †Agaricocrinus planoconvexus
 †Agaricocrinus wortheni – tentative report
 †Agassizocrinus
 †Agassizocrinus conicus
 †Agassizocrinus gibbosua
 †Agassizocrinus laevis
 †Agassizocrinus lobatus
 †Ahrensisporites
 †Ahrensisporites guerickei
 †Alaskadiscus
 †Alaskadiscus magnus
 †Alaskadiscus subacutus
 †Alastega
 †Alastega martini – type locality for species
   †Alethopteris
 †Alethopteris decurrens
 †Alethopteris lonchitica – or unidentified comparable form
 †Allonychia
 †Allonychia flanaganensis
 †Alloprosallocrinus
 †Alloprosallocrinus conicus
 †Allorisma
 †Allosaccus
 †Allumettoceras
 †Allumettoceras tenerum – or unidentified comparable form
 †Alveolites
 †Alveolites asperus
 †Alveolites constans
 †Alveolites expatiatus
 †Alveolites fibrosus
 †Alveolites goldfussi
 †Alveolites labrosus
 †Alveolites louisvillensis
 †Alveolites minimus
 †Alveolites mordax
 †Alveolites squamosus
 †Alveolites undosus
 †Alveolites winchellana
 †Amaurotoma
 †Amaurotoma leavenworthana
 †Amblytochiton
 †Amblytochiton incomptus – type locality for species
 †Ambochia
 †Ambonychia
 †Ambonychia byrnesi
 †Ambonychia ulrichi – or unidentified comparable form
 †Ammonellipsites
 †Amphiscapha
 †Amphiscapha catilloides
 †Amphissites
 †Amphissites centronotoides
 †Amphissites mimicus
 †Amphissites planoventralis
 †Amphissites vanniae
 †Amphoracrinus
 †Amplexizaphrentis
 †Amplexizaphrentis compressus
 †Amplexizaphrentis spinulosus
  †Amplexopora
 †Amplexopora minnesotensis
 †Amplexopora minor
 †Amplexopora persimilis
 †Amplexopora winchelli – or unidentified comparable form
 †Amplexus
 †Amplexus fragilis
 †Amygdalocystites
 †Amygdalocystites fiorealis
 †Anapiculatisporites
 †Anapiculatisporites minor
 †Anastrophia – tentative report
 †Anazyga
 †Anazyga recurvirostra
 †Anchiopella
 †Anchiopella anchiops
 †Anematina
 †Anematina proutana
 † Anisophyllum
 †Anisophyllum trifurcatum
 †Anisophyllum unilargum – tentative report
 †Ankyropteris
 †Ankyropteris brongniartii
   †Annularia
 †Annularia galioides
 †Anomalocrinus
 †Anomalodonta
 †Anomalodonta gigantea
 †Aorocrinus
 †Aorocrinus nodulus – type locality for species
 †Aparchites
 †Aparchites minutissimus
 †Apiculatasporites
 †Apiculatasporites variocorneus
 †Apodasmocrinus
 †Apodasmocrinus punctatus
 †Aptochilina
 †Arabellites
 †Arabellites cornutus
 †Arachnophyllum
 †Arachnophyllum mamillare
 †Arachnophyllum mammillare
 †Arachnophyllum pentagonum – type locality for species
 †Arachnophyllum quadrangulare
 †Arachnophyllum separatum
 †Arachnophyllum sinemurum – type locality for species
 †Arachnophyllum striatum
   †Archaeocidaris
 †Archaeocidaris norwoodi
 †Archaeocrinus
 †Archaeocrinus peculiaris
 †Archaeopitys
 †Archaeopitys eastmanii
 †Archaeopteris
 †Archaeopteris eastmanii
  †Archimedes
 †Archimedes communis
 †Archimedes compactus
 †Archimedes confertus
 †Archimedes distans
 †Archimedes invaginatus
 †Archimedes lativolvis
 †Archimedes macfarlani
 †Archimedes meekanoides
 †Archimedes meekanus
 †Archimedes proutanus
 †Archimedes sublaxus
 †Archimedes swallowvanus
 †Archimedes terebriformis
 †Archinacella
 †Archinacella simulatrix
 †Arnoldella
 †Arnoldella minuta
 †Arthraria
 †Arthraria rogersensis
 †Arthropitys
 †Arthropitys communis
 †Arthroxylon
 †Asolanus
 †Aspidopora
 †Aspidopora newberryi
 †Astarella
 †Astartella – tentative report
 †Astartella concentrica
   †Asteracanthus
 †Asteracanthus siderius – type locality for species
 †Asterophyllites
 †Asterophyllites charaeformis
 †Asterophyllites longifolius
 †Asthenophyllum
 †Asthenophyllum davisi – type locality for species
 †Asthenophyllum scitulum – tentative report
 †Astrocerium
 †Astrocerium hisingeri
 †Astrocerium niagarense
 †Astrocerium venustum
 †Atactopora
 †Atactoporella
 †Atactoporella newportensis
 †Atelestocrinus
 †Atelestocrinus kentuckyensis – type locality for species
 †Athyris
 †Athyris fultonensis
  †Atrypa
 †Augustoceras
 †Augustoceras shideleri – type locality for species
 †Aulacera
 †Aulacera cylindrica
 †Aulacera intermedia
 †Aulacera nodulifera
 †Aulacera plummeri
 †Aulocrinus
 †Aulocrinus bellus
 †Aulocystis
 †Aulocystis auloporoidea
 †Aulocystis jacksoni
 †Aulocystis procumbens – tentative report
 †Aulocystis transitorius – type locality for species
  †Aulopora
 †Aulopora precius
 †Aulopora pygmaea – tentative report
 †Aulopora tubiporoides
 †Australosutura
  †Aviculopecten
 †Aviculopecten germanus – or unidentified related form

B

 Bairdia
 †Bairdia salemensis
 †Balticopora
 †Balticopora tenuimurale
 †Barycrinus
 †Barycrinus asteriscus – or unidentified related form
 †Barycrinus cornutus
 †Barycrinus rhombiferus
 †Barycrinus sculptilis
 †Barycrinus sculptus
 †Barycrinus spurius
 †Barycrinus stellatus
 †Barycrinus tumidus
 †Batherocystis
 †Batherocystis appressa
 †Bathyurus
 †Bathyurus ingalli – or unidentified comparable form
 †Batocrinus
 †Batocrinus calyculus
 †Batocrinus icosodactylus
 †Batocrinus spergenensis
 †Batostoma
 †Batostoma humile – or unidentified comparable form
 †Batostomella
 †Batostomella gracilis
 †Beecheria
 †Beecheria formosa – tentative report
 †Belemnospongia
 †Belemnospongia parmula
  †Bellerophon
 †Beloitoceras
 †Beloitoceras huronense – or unidentified comparable form
 †Benthanyphyllum
 †Benthanyphyllum prateriforme
 †Benthanyphyllum robustum
 Berenicea
 †Beyrichia
 †Beyrichia chambersi
 †Beyrichoceras
 †Billingsastraea
 †Billingsastraea yandelli
 †Billingsocystis
 †Billingsocystis invaginata
 †Bisatoceras – tentative report
 †Blairocrinus
 †Blairocrinus protuberatus – type locality for species
 †Blothrocrinus
 †Blothrocrinus swallovi
 †Blothrophyllum
 †Blothrophyllum zaphrentiforme
 †Bolbopisthia
 †Bolbopisthia progressa reticulata – or unidentified comparable form
 †Bollia
 †Bollia persulcata
 †Borestus
 †Bostonia
 †Bostonia perplexa
 †Bothrodendron
 †Bothrodendron minutifolium
 †Bowmanites
 †Bowmanites dawsoni
 †Brachiospongia
 †Brachiospongia digitata
 †Brachymetopus
 †Brachythyris
 †Brachythyris subcardiformis
 †Brachythyris suborbicularis
 †Bucanapsis
 †Bucania
 †Bucania halli
 †Bucania pojetai – type locality for species
 †Bucania rugatina
 †Bucania subangulata
 †Bucania sublata
 †Bucanopsis
 †Bucanopsis carinifera
 †Bucanopsis diabloensis
 †Bulimorpha
 †Bulimorpha bulimiformis
 †Bulimorpha elongata
  †Bumastus
 †Byssonychia
 †Byssonychia radiata
 †Byssonychia richmondensis
 Bythocypris
 †Bythocypris cylindrica
 †Bythocypris lydeae

C

   †Calamites
 †Calamites cistii
 †Calamites undulatus
 †Calamocarpon
 †Calamocarpon insignis
 †Calamopitys
 †Calamopitys americana
 †Calamopitys foerstei
 †Calamopteris
 †Calamopteris hippocrepis
 †Calamoptys
 †Calamoptys foerstei
 †Calamospora
 †Calamospora hartungiana
 †Calamostachys
 †Calamostachys binneyana
 †Calapoecia
 †Calapoecia huronensis
  †Callixylon
 †Callixylon brownii
 †Calopora
 †Calopora ramosa
 †Calostylis
 †Calostylis lindstroemi
 †Calostylis spongiosa
 †Calyptaulax
 †Calyptaulax strasburgensis – or unidentified comparable form
 †Camarotoechia
 †Camarotoechia mutata
 †Camerella
 †Camerella immatura – or unidentified related form
   †Cameroceras
 †Cameroceras rowenaense – type locality for species
 †Cameroceras trentonense – or unidentified comparable form
 †Camptocrinus
 †Camptocrinus crawfordsvillensis
 †Camptocrinus nudus
 †Canadocystis
 †Canadocystis tennesseensis
 †Cantabricanites – tentative report
 †Cantabricanites greenei
 †Carabocrinus
 †Carabocrinus micropunctatus
 †Carabocrinus plate – informal
 †Carinaropsis
 †Carinaropsis cymbula
 †Carinaropsis explanata – type locality for species
 †Carinaropsis minima
 †Cartersoceras
 †Cartersoceras popei – type locality for species
 †Cartersoceras shideleri
 †Catillocrinus
 †Catillocrinus tennesseeae
 †Cavellina
 †Ceramophylla
 †Ceramophylla alternatum
 †Ceramoporella
 †Cerartoleperditia
 †Cerartoleperditia kentuckyensis
 †Ceratopsis
 †Ceratopsis chambersi
 †Ceratopsis intemedia
 †Ceratopsis intermedia
 †Ceratopsis oculifera – or unidentified related form
  †Ceraurus
 †Cestocrinus – tentative report
 †Chasmatopora
 †Cheirocystis
 †Cheirocystis fultonensis – type locality for species
 †Chonetes
 †Cincinnaticrinus
 †Cincinnaticrinus varibrachialis
  †Cincinnetina
 †Cincinnetina meeki
 †Cincinnetina multisecta
  †Cladochonus
 †Cladochonus beecheri
 †Cladochonus crassus
 †Cladopora
 †Cladopora aculeata
 †Cladopora acupicta
 †Cladopora bifura
 †Cladopora gulielmi
 †Cladopora imbricata
 †Cladopora menis – tentative report
 †Cladopora ordinata
 †Cladopora reticulata
 †Cladoxylon
 †Clathrospira
 †Clathrospira conica
 †Clathrospira subconica
 †Claudeonychia – tentative report
 †Claudeonychia byrnesi
 †Cleionychia
  †Cleiothyridina
 †Cleiothyridina hirsuta
 †Cleiothyridina sublamellosa
 †Clepsydropsis
 †Clepsydropsis bertrandi
 †Clepsydropsis campbelli
 †Clepsydropsis chaneyi
 †Clepsydropsis titan
  †Climacograptus
 †Climacograptus putillus
 †Clinopistha
 †Clinopistha radiata
 †Codaster
 †Codaster jessieae
 †Coeliocrinus
 †Coeliocrinus subspinosus
 †Coenites
 †Coenites verticillatus
 †Colaptomena
 †Colpomya
 †Colpomya constricta
 †Colpomya faba
  †Composita
 †Composita subquadrata
 †Composita trinuclea
 †Conostoma
 †Conostoma anglogermanicum
 †Conostoma oblongum
  †Constellaria
 †Constellaria florida – or unidentified comparable form
 †Constellaria teres
 †Conularia
 †Conularia formosa
 †Conularia trentonensis
 †Convolutispora
 †Coopericystis
 †Coopericystis pyriformis
  †Cordaites
 †Cordaites felicis
  †Cornulites
 †Coronocystis
 †Coronocystis angulatus
 †Cosmetocrinus
 †Cosmetocrinus gracilis
 †Costalocrinus
 †Costalocrinus conkini – type locality for species
 †Costalocrinus cornutus
 †Costalocrinus rex
 †Costatulites
 †Costatulites richmondensis
  †Crania – tentative report
 †Craniops
 †Craniops cincinnatiensis
 †Crassispora
 †Crassispora kosankei
 †Craterophyllum
 †Craterophyllum adnascens
 †Craterophyllum invaginatum
 †Craterophyllum solitarium
 †Cryptolithus
 †Cryptolithus bellulus
 †Cryptolithus recurvus
 †Cryptolithus tesselatus
 †Ctenobolbina
 †Ctenobolbina ciliata
 †Ctenodonta
 †Ctenodonta logani – or unidentified related form
 †Ctenodonta longa – or unidentified related form
 †Ctenodonta nasuta – or unidentified comparable form
 †Ctenodonta obliqua
 †Ctenodonta regia
 †Ctenodonta socialis
 †Cuffeyella
 †Cuffeyella arachnoidea
 †Culmicrinus
 †Culmicrinus verus
 †Cuneamya
 †Cupulocrinus
 †Cyathactis
 †Cyathactis sedentarius
 †Cyathactis typus
 †Cyathaxonia
 †Cyathaxonia venusta
  †Cyathocrinites
 †Cyathocrinites asperrimus
 †Cyathocrinites astralus – type locality for species
 †Cyathocrinites farleyi
 †Cyathocrinites glenni
 †Cyathocrinites iowensis
 †Cyathocrinites kelloggi
 †Cyathocrinites multibrachiatus
 †Cyathocrinites nodosus
 †Cyathocrinites parvibrachiatus
 †Cyathophylloides
 †Cybelinidae
 †Cybelinidae cranidium – informal
 †Cycloconcha
 †Cycloconcha milleri
 †Cycloconcha ovata – or unidentified related form
 †Cyclocyclopa
 †Cyclocystoides
 †Cyclogranisporites
 †Cyclogranisporites aureus – or unidentified comparable form
 †Cyclogranisporites minutus
 †Cyclonema
 †Cyclonema minuta
 †Cyclopentagonopa
 †Cyclora – tentative report
  †Cydrocrinus
 †Cydrocrinus concinnus – tentative report
 †Cydrocrinus subramulosus – tentative report
 †Cymatonota
  †Cyphaspis
 †Cyphotrypa
 †Cyphotrypa acervulosa
 †Cyphotrypa clarksvillensis
 †Cypricardinia
 †Cypricardinia indianensis
 †Cyrtina
  †Cyrtoceras
 †Cyrtodonta
 †Cyrtodonta grandis
 †Cyrtodonta subovata
 †Cyrtodontula
 †Cyrtodontula umbonata
 †Cyrtolites
 †Cyrtolites claysferryensis – type locality for species
 †Cyrtolites inornatum
 †Cyrtolites ornatus – tentative report
 †Cyrtolites retrorsus
 †Cyrtospira
 †Cyrtospira bicurvata – type locality for species
 †Cyrtostropha
 †Cyrtostropha salteri
 †Cystihalysites
 †Cystihalysites nexus
 †Cystiphylloides
 †Cystiphylloides americanum
 †Cystiphylloides crassatum
 †Cystiphyllum
 †Cystiphyllum granilineatum
 †Cystiphyllum niagarense
 †Cystiphyllum spinulosum
 †Cystodictya
 †Cystodictya lineata
 Cytherella

D

 †Dalejina
 †Dalmanella
 †Dalmanella emacerata
 †Dalmanella fertilis
 †Dalmanella sulcata
 †Dalmanophyllum
 †Dalmanophyllum gainesi
 †Dalmanophyllum herzeri
 †Dalmanophyllum linguliferum
  †Decadocrinus
 †Decadocrinus scalaris
 †Deceptrix
 †Deceptrix hartsvillensis – or unidentified comparable form
 †Deceptrix perminuta
 †Declinognathodus
 †Declinognathodus delicatus – or unidentified related form
 †Declinognathodus donetzianus
 †Declinognathodus marginodosus
 †Decoroproetus
 †Decoroproetus parviusculus
 †Deiroceras
 †Deiroceras curdsvillense
 †Dekayia
 †Deliablastus
 †Deliablastus cumberlandensis
 †Deltoidospora
 †Deltoidospora priddyi
 †Densosporites
 †Densosporites annulatus
 †Densosporites glandulosus
 †Densosporites sphaerotriangularis
 †Dentiblastus
 †Diabolocrinus
 †Diabolocrinus vesperalis
 †Dichocrinus
 †Dichocrinus ficus – tentative report
 †Dichocrinus gracilis
 †Dichocrinus pocillum – tentative report
 †Dichocrinus simplex
 †Dichocrinus ulrichi
 †Dictyophlois
 †Dictyophlois reticulata
 †Dictyotomaria
 †Dictyotomaria nyi
 †Dictyotriletes
 †Dictyotriletes bireticulatus
 †Dielasma
 †Dielasma formosa
 †Diestoceras
 †Diestoceras indianense
 †Diichnia
 †Diichnia kentuckiensis
 †Dilobella
 †Dimegelasma
 †Dimorphoceratoides
 †Dimorphoceratoides adamsi – type locality for species
 †Dinophyllum
 †Dinophyllum hoskinsoni
 †Dinophyllum stokesi
 †Dinorthis
 †Dinorthis pectinella
 †Diorychopora
 †Diorychopora tenuis
 †Diploblastus
  †Diplograptus
 †Disphyllum
 †Disphyllum synaptophylloides
  †Dizygocrinus
 †Dizygocrinus biturbinatus
 †Dizygocrinus montgomeryensis
 †Dizygocrinus whitei
 †Doleroides
 †Dolichoharpes
 †Donaldina
 †Donaldina zadoe
 †Dorycrinus
 †Dorycrinus gouldi
 †Dorycrinus quinquelobus
 †Drymopora
 †Drymopora fascicularis
 †Dzhaprakoceras
 †Dzhaprakoceras brodheadense – type locality for species

E

 †Ectenocrinus
 †Ectenocrinus simplex
 †Edaphophyllum
 †Edaphophyllum laciniatum – tentative report
 †Edmondia
 †Edrioaster
 †Edrioaster bigsbyi
 †Edrioaster priscus
 †Emmonsia
 †Emmonsia amplissima
 †Emmonsia arbuscula
 †Emmonsia bacula
 †Emmonsia convexa
 †Emmonsia emmonsi
 †Emmonsia epidermata
 †Emmonsia epidermi
 †Emmonsia eximia
 †Emmonsia radiciformis
 †Emmonsia ramosa
 †Emmonsia tuberosa
   †Endoceras
 †Endoceras proteiformis
 †Endothyra
 †Endothyra baileyi
 †Endothyranella
 †Endothyranella inflata
 †Endothyranella kentuckyensis
 †Enoploura
 †Enoploura punctata – or unidentified comparable form
 †Entelophyllum
 †Entelophyllum eruciforme
 †Entelophyllum rugosum
 †Entelophyllum strictum
 Eocaudina
 †Eocaudina gutschicki
 †Eocaudina mccormacki
 †Eochonetes
 †Eochonetes clarksvillensis
 †Eoleperditia
 †Eoleperditia catheysensis – or unidentified comparable form
 †Eoleperditia fabulites
 †Eolissochonetes
 †Eolissochonetes morsei
 †Eopteria
 †Eopteria conocardiformis
 †Eospirifer
 †Eotomaria
 †Ephippioceras
 †Ephippioceras ferratum
  †Equisetum
 †Equisetum arvense
 †Eratacrinus
 †Eratacrinus coxanus
 †Eremopteris
 †Eremopteris gracilis
  †Eretmocrinus
 †Eretmocrinus cloelia
 †Eretmocrinus magnificus
 †Eretmocrinus ramulosus
 †Eretmocrinus yandelli
 †Eridophyllum
 †Eridophyllum archiaci
 †Eridophyllum coagulatum
 †Eridophyllum seriale
 †Eridophyllum tumidulum
 †Eridopora
 †Eridorthis
 †Eridorthis nicklesi
 †Eridotrypa
 †Eridotrypa briareus – or unidentified comparable form
 †Eridotrypa mutabilis
 †Escharopora
 †Escharopora falciformis
 †Escharopora hilli
 †Escharopora nodulosa – or unidentified comparable form
 †Etheridgella
 †Etheridgella biconvexa – type locality for species
 †Eucladocrinus
 †Eucladocrinus millebrachiatus
 †Euconospira
 †Euconospira conula
 †Eumetria
 †Eumetria marcyi
 †Eumetria vera
 †Eumetria verneuiliana
 †Eumetria verneuliana
 †Eunema
 †Eunema centralis
 †Eunema helicteres
 †Eunicites
 †Eupachycrinus
 †Eupachycrinus germanus
 †Eupachycrinus spartarius
 †Euphemites
 †Euphemites randolphensis
 †Euryocrinus
 †Euryocrinus tennesseensis

F

 †Favistella
 †Favistella alveolata
 †Favistina
 †Favistina stellata
   †Favosites
 †Favosites arbor
 †Favosites biloculi
 †Favosites clausus
 †Favosites delandi
 †Favosites densitabulatus
 †Favosites discoideus
 †Favosites discus
 †Favosites divergens
 †Favosites favosus
 †Favosites hamiltoniae
 †Favosites hisingeri
 †Favosites niagarensis
 †Favosites placenta
 †Favosites proximatus
 †Favosites quercus
 †Favosites rotundituba
 †Favosites turbinatus
 †Fenestella
 †Fenestella multispinosa
 †Fenestella rudis
 †Fenestella serratula
 †Fimbrispirifer
 †Fimbrispirifer venustus
 †Fistulipora
 †Fistulipora incrustans
 †Fistulipora perdensa
 †Fistulipora spergenensis
  †Flexicalymene
 †Flexicalymene granulosa
 †Flexicalymene griphus
 †Flexicalymene meeki
 †Florinites
 †Florinites mediapudens
 †Foerstephyllum
 †Foerstephyllum vacuum
 †Foerstia
 †Foerstia ohioensis
 †Follotites 
 †Follotites bighillensis – type locality for species
  †Forbesiocrinus
 †Forbesiocrinus multibrachiatus
 †Forbesiocrinus wortheni
 †Forbesiocrinus wortheri
 †Furcitella
 †Furcitella scofieldi – or unidentified comparable form
 †Fusispira
 †Fusispira sulcata

G

 †Galtiera
 †Galtiera bostonensis
 †Gastrioceras
 †Gastrioceras magoffinense – type locality for species
 †Gaulocrinus
 †Gaulocrinus bordeni
 †Gaulocrinus symmetros – type locality for species
 †Gaulocrinus trantscholdi
 †Gaulocrinus veryi
 †Geniculograptus
 †Geniculograptus typicalis
  †Gilbertsocrinus
 †Gilbertsocrinus tuberculosus – tentative report
 †Gilbertsocrinus tuberosus
 †Gilbertsocrinus typus – tentative report
 †Girtyella
 †Girtyella brevilobata
 †Girtyella turgida
 †Glabrocingulum
 †Glabrocingulum ellenae – type locality for species
 †Globozyga
 †Globozyga littonana
 †Globulocystites
 †Glossina
 †Glossina nebraskensis
  †Glyptocrinus
 †Glyptocrinus nodosus
 †Glyptopleura
 †Glyptopleura parvacostata
 †Glyptopleura perbella
 †Glyptopora
 †Glyptopora sagenella
 †Glyptorthis
 †Glyptorthis insculpta
 †Gnathodus
 †Gnathodus bulbosus
 †Gnathodus pseudosemiglaber
 †Gnathodus semiglaber
 †Gnathodus texanus
  †Goniatites
 †Goniocyclus
 †Gorbyoceras
 †Gorbyoceras tetreauense – or unidentified comparable form
 †Gordonaster
 †Gordonaster brassfieldensis
 †Gosseletina
 †Gosseletina johnsoni
 †Gosseletina subglobosa
 †Grammysia – tentative report
 †Granasporites
 †Granasporites medius
 †Granatocrinus
 †Granatocrinus granulatus
 †Granulatisporites
 †Granulatisporites granularis
 †Granulatisporites granulatus
 †Granulatisporites pallidus
 †Granulatisporites verrucosus
 †Graptodictya
  †Gravicalymene
 †Gravicalymene hagani
 †Grewingikia
 †Grewingikia rustica
  †Grewingkia
 †Grewingkia rusticum
 †Grumosisporites
 †Grumosisporites varioreticulatus
 †Gyronema
 †Gyronema pulchellum

H

 †Hadroblastus
 †Hallia
 †Hallia strigata – tentative report
   †Hallopora
 †Hallopora multitabulata
 †Hallopora onealli
 †Halysiocrinus
 †Halysiocrinus cumberlandensis
 †Halysiocrinus dactylus
 †Halysiocrinus tunicatus
   †Halysites
 †Halysites louisvillensis – type locality for species
 †Halysites meandrinus – tentative report
 †Halysites nitidus
 †Haplistion
 †Haplistion armstrongi
 †Hapsiphyllum
 †Hapsiphyllum cassedayi
 †Hapsiphyllum cassedeyi
 †Hebertella
 †Hebertella alveolata
 †Hebertella frankfortensis
 †Hebertella occidentalis
 †Hebertella parkensis
 †Hebertella parksensis
 †Hebertella sinuata
 †Helicelasma
 †Helicelasma rusticum
 †Helicotoma
 †Helicotoma planulatoides – type locality for species
 †Heliolites
 †Heliolites megastoma
 †Heliolites romingeri
 †Heliolites spongiosus
 †Heliolites spongodes
 †Heliolites subtubulatus
  †Heliophyllum
 †Heliophyllum alternatum
 †Heliophyllum ethelanum
 †Heliophyllum gurleyi
 †Heliophyllum halli
 †Heliophyllum infundibulum
 †Heliophyllum insigne
 †Heliophyllum tenuiseptatum
 †Helminthochiton
 †Helminthochiton blacki
 †Hemiphragma
 †Hemiphragma tenuimurale – or unidentified comparable form
 †Hemitrypa
 †Hesperorthis
 †Hesperorthis tricenaria
 †Heterophrentis
 †Heterophrentis concava
 †Heterophrentis foliata
 †Heterophrentis simplex
 †Heterophrentis subcompressa
 †Heterorthina
 †Heterorthina macfarlani
 †Heterotrypa
 †Heterotrypa frondosa – or unidentified comparable form
 †Heterotrypa trentonensis
 †Hierogramma
 †Hierogramma jeffreyi
 †Hindia
 †Hindia parva
 †Hippocardia
 †Hiscobeccus
 †Hiscobeccus capax
 †Histocrinus
 †Histocrinus coreyi
 †Histocrinus stellatus – tentative report
 †Hoareicardia
 †Hoareicardia cunea
 †Holcocrinus
 †Holcocrinus nodobrachiatus
 †Holcocrinus spinobrachiatus
  †Holopea
 †Holopea insignis
 †Holopea parvula – or unidentified comparable form
 †Holtedahlina
 †Holtedahlina sulcata
 †Homaloneura – type locality for genus
 †Homaloneura redbirdi – type locality for species
 †Homotelus
 †Homotrypa
 †Homotrypa callosa
 †Homotrypa similis
 †Hormotoma
 †Hormotoma gracilis
 †Hudsonospongia
 †Hustedia
 †Hustedia miseri – or unidentified comparable form
 †Hustedia mormoni – or unidentified comparable form
 †Hybocrinus
 †Hybocrinus tumidus
 †Hybocystites
 †Hybocystites problematicus
 †Hylodecrinus
 †Hylodecrinus asper
 †Hylodecrinus bonoensis
 †Hylodecrinus briareus – tentative report
 †Hylodecrinus sculptus
 
 †Hyolithes
 †Hyolithes parviuscula
 †Hypergonia
 †Hypergonia marvinwelleri
 †Hypselocrinus
 †Hypselocrinus campanulus
 †Hypselocrinus hoveyi

I

 †Ianthinopsis
 †Ianthinopsis medialis
 †Idiognathoides
 †Idiognathoides ouachitensis
 †Idiognathoides sinuatus
 †Idiognathoides tuberculatus
 †Imitoceras
  †Iocrinus
 †Ischyrodonta
 †Ischyrodonta elongata – tentative report
 †Ischyrodonta modioliformis
 †Isochilina
 †Isochilina ampla – or unidentified comparable form
 †Isorophus
 †Isorophus cincinnatiensis
 †Isorthoceras
 †Isorthoceras albersi – type locality for species
  †Isotelus
 †Isotelus gigas
 †Isotelus maximus

J

 †Jonesella
 †Jonesella crepidiformis
 †Jonesella obscura – or unidentified related form

K

 †Kalymma
 †Kalymma auriculata
 †Kalymma grandis
 †Kalymma hippocrepis
 †Kalymma lirata
 †Kalymma minuta
 †Kalymma resinosa
 †Kaskia
 †Kaskia chesterensis
 †Kazakhstania
 †Kazakhstania colubrella
 †Kazakhstania mangeri
 †Ketophyllum
 †Ketophyllum intertrium
 †Kinkaidia – type locality for genus
 †Kinkaidia cancellata – type locality for species
 †Kirkbya
 †Kodonophyllum
 †Kodonophyllum vadum
 †Krausella

L

 †Labechia
 †Labechia huronensis
 †Laccoprimitia
 †Laccoprimitia centralis
 †Lambeophyllum – tentative report
 †Lamprophyllum
 †Lamprophyllum niagarense
 †Lanecrinus
 †Lanecrinus depressus
 †Lanecrinus repertus
 †Lanthanaster
 †Lanthanaster intermedius
 †Laphamoceras
 †Laphamoceras scofieldi – or unidentified comparable form
 †Lecocrinus
 †Lecocrinus springeri
 †Lekocrinus
 †Lekocrinus planibrachiatus
 †Leperditella
 †Leperditella glabra
 †Leperditia
 †Leperditia caecigena
 †Lepidocoleus
    †Lepidodendron
 †Lepidodendron aculeatum – or unidentified comparable form
 †Lepidodendron baylense
 †Lepidodendron boylensis
 †Lepidodendron noralbaniense
 †Lepidodendron volkmannianum
 †Lepidophylloides
 †Lepidophylloides longifolium
 †Lepidostrobophyllum
 †Lepidostrobophyllum lanceolatum
 †Lepidostrobus
 †Lepidostrobus fisheri
 †Lepidostrobus kentuckiensis
 †Lepidostrobus ornatus – tentative report
 †Lepidostrobus shopfii – type locality for species
 †Leptaena
 †Leptaena gibbosa
 †Leptaena kentuckiana – type locality for species
 †Leptaena richmondensis
 †Levizygopleura
 †Levizygopleura inornata
  †Lingulella
 †Linoproductus
 †Linoproductus cora
 †Liospira
 †Liospira decipens
 †Liospira micula
 †Liospira progne
 †Liospira vitruvia
 †Liroceras
 †Listrochiton – type locality for genus
 †Listrochiton weiri – type locality for species
  Lithophaga – tentative report
 †Litostrobus
 †Litostrobus iowensis – or unidentified comparable form
 †Lophophyllidium
 †Lophophyllidium proliferum
 †Lophospira
 †Lophospira abnormis
 †Lophospira decursa – or unidentified comparable form
 †Lophospira milleri
 †Lophospira obliqua
 †Lophospira perangulata
 †Lophospira type locality for species A – informal
 †Lophotriletes
 †Lophotriletes gibbosus
 †Loxobucania
 †Loxobucania lindsleyi – type locality for species
 †Loxobucania nashvillensis
 †Loxobucania singularis – type locality for species
 †Loxonema
 †Loxonema nitida
 †Loxoplocus
 †Lycopogenia
 †Lycopogenia callicyrta
 †Lycospora
 †Lycospora granulata
 †Lycospora micropapillata
 †Lycospora pellucida
 †Lycospora pusilla
 †Lycospora rotunda
 †Lycospora subjuga
 †Lyrodesma
 †Lyrodesma acuminatum – or unidentified comparable form
 †Lyrodesma inornatum – tentative report

M

 †Maclurites
 †Macrocrinus
 †Macrocrinus konincki
 †Macrocrinus mundulus
 †Macrocrinus verneuillianus
 †Macurdablastus
 †Macurdablastus uniplicatus
 †Maelonoceras
 †Maelonoceras praematurum – or unidentified comparable form
 †Magnuscrinus
 †Magnuscrinus kammeri
 †Magnuscrinus praegravis
 †Marginatia
 †Marginicinctus
 †Marginifera
 †Mariopteris
 †Mariopteris nervosa
 †Masonoceras – type locality for genus
 †Masonoceras kentuckiense – type locality for species
 †Maximites
 †Maximites nassichuki – type locality for species
 †Meekopora
 †Meekopora eximia
 †Meekospira
 †Meekospira evansvillensis
 †Meekospira minuta
 †Meekospira mississippiensis
 †Meekospira peracuta
 †Megalaspidae – tentative report
 †Megalaspidae pygidium – informal
 †Megalomphala
 †Megalomphala crassa
 †Meniscocrinus
  †Meristella
 †Meristella nasuta
 †Meristina – tentative report
 †Meristoschisma
 †Meristoschisma hudsoni
 †Merocanites
 †Merocrinus
 †Mesocyridira
 †Mesocyridira flagrocosta
 †Mesocyridira washingtonensis
 †Mesopalaeaster
 †Mesopalaeaster finei
 †Mesopilocrinus – tentative report
 †Mesopilocrinus romingeri
 †Mesotrypa
 †Mespilocrinus
 †Mespilocrinus kentuckyensis – type locality for species
 †Mespilocrinus myllos
 †Mespilocrinus romingeri
 †Metablastus
 †Metablastus bipyramidalis
 †Metablastus wortheni
 †Metacromyocrinus
 †Metacromyocrinus oklahomenisis
 †Metichthyocrinus
 †Metichthyocrinus clarkensis
 †Metichthyocrinus tiaraeformis
 †Michelinia
 †Michelinoceras
 †Micnoceras – or unidentified comparable form
 †Microceras – tentative report
 †Micromphalus – type locality for genus
 †Micromphalus turris – type locality for species
 †Micropileus
 †Micropileus variabilis
 †Microzygia
 †Microzygia lacunosa
 †Milleratia
 †Milleratia shideleri – or unidentified related form
 †Mimella
 †Mitrospermum
 †Mitrospermum compressum
 †Modiolodon
 †Modiolodon oviformis
 †Modiolopsis
 †Modiolopsis modiolaris
 †Monomuchites
 †Monomuchites annularis – type locality for species
 †Monomuchites costalis – or unidentified comparable form
 †Monomuchites obliquum – type locality for species
 †Monticulipora
 †Mourlonia
 †Muensteroceras
 †Muensteroceras oweni
 †Murchisonia
 †Murinella – tentative report
 †Murrayoceras
 †Murrayoceras murrayi – or unidentified comparable form

N

 †Nannillaneus
 †Neoicoceras
 †Neoicoceras elkhornense – type locality for species
  †Neospirifer
 †Neospirifer cameratus
 †Neozaphrentis
  †Neuropteris
 †Neuropteris gigantea
 †Neuropteris heterophylla
 †Neuropteris tenuifolia – or unidentified comparable form
 †Nipterocrinus
 †Nipterocrinus monroensis
 †Nucleospira – tentative report
 Nuculana
 †Nuculana belliostriata
 †Nucularca
 †Nucularca cingulata
 †Nucularca pectunculoides – or unidentified related form
 †Nuculites
 †Nuculites fabula
 †Nuculopsis
 †Nuculopsis girtyi
 †Nuculopsis subrotunda
 †Nyctopora – tentative report

O

 †Octonaria
 †Octonaria bicava
 †Odontophyllum
 †Odontophyllum convergens
 †Odontophyllum patellatum
 †Odontophyllum tornatum
 †Oepikina
 †Oepikina minnesotensis
 †Oliganisus
 †Oncoceras
 †Oncoceras major – type locality for species
 †Oncoceras multicameratum
 †Onniella
  †Onychocrinus
 †Onychocrinus grandis – type locality for species
 †Onychocrinus pulaskiensis
 †Orbiculoidea
 †Orbiculoidea convexa
 †Orbiculoidea manhattensis
 †Orbitremites
 †Orbitremites coralridgensis – type locality for species
 †Orbitremites kentuckyensis – type locality for species
 †Orbitremites oppelti
 †Ordogeisonoceras
 †Ordogeisonoceras amplicameratum – type locality for species
 †Ormoceras
 †Ormoceras ferecentricum – type locality for species
 †Orthis
 †Orthis testudinaria
  †Orthoceras
 †Orthodesma
 †Orthonybyoceras
 †Orthonychia
 †Orthonychia chesterense
 †Orthorhynchula
 †Orthorhynchula linneyi
 †Orthorhynchula sublinneyi
 †Orthotetes
 †Ovatia

P

 †Pachydictya
 †Pachyglossella
 †Pachylocrinus
 †Pachylocrinus aequalis
 †Palaeacis
 †Palaeacis cuniformis
 †Palaeocapulus
 †Palaeocapulus acutirostre
 †Palaeocaudina
 †Palaeocaudina kansasensis
 †Palaeoconcha
 †Palaeoconcha obliqua
 †Palaeocrinus
 †Palaeocrinus avondalensis
 †Palaeocrinus planobasalis
 †Palaeoneila
 †Palaeoneilo
 †Palaeoneilo socialis
 †Palaeopteria
 †Palaeopteria parvula – or unidentified related form
 †Palaeostylus – tentative report
 †Palaeozygopleura
 †Palaeozygopleura delphicola
 †Paleofavosites
 †Paleofavosites prolificus
 †Paracyrtolites
 †Paracyrtolites parvus – type locality for species
 †Paracyrtolites subplanus
 †Paradichocrinus
 †Paradichocrinus liratus
 †Paradichocrinus planus
 †Paradichocrinus polydactylus
 †Paradichocrinus ramus
 †Paradichocrinus sculptus
 †Paragassizocrinus
 †Paragassizocrinus disculus – or unidentified comparable form
 †Paragassizocrinus kendrickensis
 †Paragassizocrinus turris – or unidentified comparable form
 †Paraliospira – tentative report
 †Paraliospira mundula – type locality for species
 †Paraparchites
 †Paraparchites subcircularis
 †Parascytalocrinus
 †Parascytalocrinus hamiltonensis
 †Parascytalocrinus pentagonus
 †Parisocrinus – tentative report
 †Parvohallopora
 †Parvohallopora onealli
 †Parvohallopora ramosa
 †Patellilabia
 †Patellilabia chesterensis
 †Patellostium
 †Pattersonia
 †Pattersonia aurita
 †Pattersonia tuberosa
 †Paupospira
 †Paupospira bowdeni
 †Paupospira burginensis
 †Paupospira oweni
 †Paupospira sumnerensis
 †Paupospira tenuistriata
 †Paupospira tropidophora
  †Pecopteris
 †Pecopteris plumosa – or unidentified comparable form
 †Pelecocrinus
 †Pelecocrinus type locality for species – informal
 †Pellecrinus
 †Pellecrinus obuncus
 †Pentagonia
 †Pentagonia biplicata
  †Pentamerus
  †Pentremites
 †Pentremites abruptus
 †Pentremites clavatus
 †Pentremites conoideus
 †Pentremites elegans
 †Pentremites girtyi
 †Pentremites godoni
 †Pentremites halli
 †Pentremites okawensis
 †Pentremites platybasis
 †Pentremites princetonensis – or unidentified comparable form
 †Pentremites pyramidatus
 †Pentremites pyriformis
 †Pentremites spicatus
 †Pentremites springeri
 †Pentremites symmetricus
 †Pentremites tulipaformis
 †Pentremites tulipiaformis
 †Pentremites welleri
 †Perditocardinia
 †Perditocardinia dubia
 †Periastron
 †Periastron perforatum
 †Periastron reticulatum
 †Periastron reticulum
 †Pericyclus
 †Peripristis
 †Peripristis semicircularis
 †Permophorus
 †Peronopora
 †Peronopora decipiens – or unidentified comparable form
 †Peronopora granulifera – or unidentified comparable form
 †Peronopora milleri
 †Petrocrania
 †Petrocrania scabiosa
 †Petropegia
 †Petropegia radiata – type locality for species
 †Petropegia spinosa – type locality for species
 †Phaneroceras
 †Phaneroceras chesnuti – type locality for species
 †Phanocrinus
 †Phanocrinus parvaramus
 †Phestia
 †Phestia prolongata
 †Phillibole
 †Phillipsia
 †Phillipsia bufo
 †Phragmolites
 †Phragmolites bellulus – type locality for species
 †Phragmolites compressus – type locality for species
 †Phymatophyllum
 †Phymatophyllum nanum
 †Phytokneme
 †Phytokneme rhodona
 †Pietzschia
 †Pietzschia polyupsilon
 †Pionodema
 †Pionodema rectimarginata
 †Pionomena
 †Pionomena recens
 †Pithodea
 †Pithodea americana
 †Pitys
 †Pitys brownii
  †Plaesiomys
 †Plaesiomys subquadrata
 †Plaesiomys subquatra
 †Planalvus
 †Planalvus densa
 †Planisporites
 †Planisporites granifer
 †Planoendothyra
 †Planoendothyra whitesidei – or unidentified comparable form
 †Plasmopora
 †Plasmopora elegans
 †Plasmopora follis
 †Platyaxum
 †Platyaxum foliatum
 †Platyaxum frondosum
 †Platyaxum orthosoleniskum
 †Platyaxum undosum
   †Platyceras
  †Platycrinites
 †Platycrinites bonoensis
 †Platycrinites georgii
 †Platycrinites glyptus
 †Platycrinites hemisphaericus
 †Platycrinites hemisphericus – tentative report
 †Platycrinites planus
 †Platycrinites sculptus
 †Platycrinites spinifer
 †Platylichas
 †Platylichas halli
  †Platystrophia
 †Platystrophia acutilirata
 †Platystrophia amoena
 †Platystrophia annieana
 †Platystrophia auburnensis
 †Platystrophia clarkesvillensis
 †Platystrophia clarksvillensis
 †Platystrophia colbiensis
 †Platystrophia crassa
 †Platystrophia cypha
 †Platystrophia elegantula
 †Platystrophia hopensis
 †Platystrophia laticosta
 †Platystrophia ponderosa
 †Platystrophia sublaticosta
 †Plectambonites
 †Plectambonites plicatellus
 †Plectocamara
 †Plectoceras
 †Plectoceras carletonense – or unidentified comparable form
 †Plectorthis
 †Plectorthis aequivalvis
 †Plectorthis fissicosta
 †Plectorthis plicatella
 †Plectospira
  †Pleurodictyum
 †Pleurodictyum cylindricum
 †Pleurodictyum insigne
 †Pleurodictyum louisvillensis
 †Pleurodictyum maximum
 †Pleurodictyum planum
 †Pleurodictyum wardi
  Pleurotomaria
 †Plicodendrocrinus
 †Plicodendrocrinus casei
 †Plicorachis
 †Plicorachis danvillensis
 †Pojetaconcha
 †Pojetaconcha cressmani
 †Pojetoceras – type locality for genus
 †Pojetoceras floweri – type locality for species
 †Polaricyclus
 †Polaricyclus ballardensis
 †Polaricyclus bordenensis – type locality for species
 †Polaricyclus conkini – type locality for species
 †Polygnathus
 †Polygnathus communis
 †Polygrammoceras
 †Polypora
 †Polypora simulatrix
 †Portlockiella – type locality for genus
 †Portlockiella kentuckyensis – type locality for species
 †Poteriocrinites
 †Poteriocrinites horowitzi
 †Prasopora
 †Prasopora falesi
 †Prasopora hospitalis
 †Prasopora simulatrix
 †Primaspis
 †Prismopora
 †Prismopora serrulata
 †Productus
 †Productus cestriensis
  †Proetus
 †Prolecanites
 †Prolecanites lyoni
 †Propora
 †Propora eminula
 †Propora glabra
 †Propora papillata
 †Propora puella
 †Protaraea
 †Protaraea richmondensis
 †Proteoceras
 †Proteoceras tyronensis – type locality for species
 †Protocyathactis
 †Protocyathactis cybaeus – or unidentified comparable form
 †Protosalvinia
 †Protosalvinia arnoldii
 †Protosalvinia furcata
 †Protosalvinia rarenna
 †Protosalvinia ravenna
       †Prototaxites
 †Prototaxites ortoni
 †Protozyga – tentative report
 †Pseudobigalea
 †Pseudobigalea crista
 †Pseudoconocardium
 †Pseudolingula
 †Pseudomulceodens
 †Pseudomulceodens cancellatus
 †Pseudopolygnathus
 †Pseudopolygnathus multistriatus
 †Pseudorthoceras
 †Pseudorthoceras knoxense
 †Pseudozygopleura
 †Pseudozygopleura deloi – or unidentified comparable form
 †Pseudozygopleura lanceolatus
 †Pseudozygopleura macra – or unidentified comparable form
 †Pseudozygopleura scitula
 †Pseudozygopleura semicostata
 †Pterinea
 †Pterinea demissa
 †Pterotheca
 †Pterotheca angusta
 †Pterotheca expansa
 †Pterotocrinus
 †Pterotocrinus acutus
 †Pterotocrinus armatus
 †Pterotocrinus bifurcatus
 †Pterotocrinus capitalis
 †Pterotocrinus depressus
 †Pterotocrinus lingulaformis
 †Pterotocrinus spatulatus
 †Ptychocrinus
 †Punctatisporites
 †Punctatisporites irrasus
 †Punctatisporites minutus
 †Punctospirifer
 †Punctospirifer transversus
 †Pustulatisporites
 †Pustulatisporites crenatus
 †Pycnactis
 †Pycnactis tenuiseptatus

Q

 †Quadratia
 †Quepora
 †Quepora huronensis
 †Quepora louisvillensis – type locality for species

R

 †Rafinesquina
 †Rafinesquina alternata
 †Rafinesquina ponderosa
 †Rafinesquina trentonensis
 †Rafinesquina winchesterensis
 †Raistrickia
 †Raistrickia breveminens
 †Raistrickia crocea
 †Raphistoma
 †Raphistomina
 †Raphistomina lapicida
 †Rectifenestella
 †Rectifenestella tenax
 †Reinschospora
 †Reinschospora triangularis
 †Renisporites
 †Renisporites confossus
 †Resserella
 †Reticulariina
 †Reticulariina salemensis
 †Reticulariina spinosa
 †Reticulatisporites
 †Reticulatisporites muricatus
 †Retispira
 †Retispira ornatus
 †Rhabdocyclus
 †Rhabdocyclus scutellus
 †Rhegmaphyllum
 †Rhegmaphyllum daytonensis
 †Rhineoderma
 †Rhineoderma wortheni
 †Rhinidictya
 †Rhipidomella
 †Rhipidomella dubia
 †Rhizophyllum
 †Rhizophyllum attenuatum
 †Rhizophyllum corniculum
 †Rhodocrinites
 †Rhodocrinites barrisi
 †Rhombopora
 †Rhombopora incrassata
 †Rhombotrypa
 †Rhombotrypa quadrata
 †Rhynchopora
 †Rhynchopora beecheri
 †Rhynchotrema
 †Rhynchotrema dentatum
 †Rhynchotrema increbescens
 †Rhynchotrema kentuckiensis
 †Rhytiodentalium
 †Rhytiodentalium kentuckyensis
 †Rhytiophora
 †Romingerella
 †Romingerella major
 †Romingeria
 †Romingeria cummunata
 †Romingeria umbellifera
 †Romingeria vannula
 Rostricellula
 †Rostricellula minuta
 †Ruedemannia
 †Ruedemannia lirata
 †Rugomena
 †Rugomena vetusta
 †Rugosochonetes

S

 †Saffordophyllum
 †Saffordophyllum floweri
 †Salpingostoma
 †Salpingostoma kentuckyense
 †Salterospira
 †Salterospira chesterensis
 †Sarocrinus
 †Sarocrinus varsoviensis
 †Savagellites – tentative report
 †Savagellites lindahli
 †Savitrisporites
 †Savitrisporites nux
 †Scalites
 †Scalites peracutum
 †Scenophyllum
 †Scenophyllum coniferum – tentative report
 †Schizocrania
 †Schizodus
 †Schizophaulactis
 †Schizophaulactis densiseptatus
 †Schlotheimophyllum
 †Schlotheimophyllum fulcratum
 †Schlotheimophyllum ipomaea
 †Schuchertella
 †Schuchertella costatula
 †Schuchertella minuta
  †Scytalocrinus
 †Scytalocrinus decadactylus
 †Scytalocrinus robustus
 †Seminula
 †Seminula subtilita
 †Septimyalina
 †Setigerites
 †Setigerites setiger
 †Sevillea
 †Sevillea trinucleata – or unidentified related form
 †Siderella
 †Siderella scotti
 †Similodonta
 †Similodonta hermitagensis – or unidentified related form
 †Sinuites
 †Sinuites cancellatus
 †Sinuites globularis
 †Sinuites granistriatus
 †Sinuites obesa
 †Sinuites pervoluta
 †Sinuites planodorsatus – type locality for species
 †Sinuitina
 †Sinuspores
 †Sinuspores sinuatus
 †Siphonophrentis
 †Siphonophrentis halli
 †Soleniscus
 †Soleniscus gracilis
 †Soleniscus texanus
  †Solenopora
 †Sowerbyella
 †Sowerbyella curdsvillensis
 †Sowerbyella grierensis – type locality for species
 †Sowerbyella rugosa
 †Sowerbyites
 †Spackmanites
 †Spackmanites habibii
  †Sphenophyllum
 †Sphenophyllum cuneifolium
  †Sphenopteris
 †Sphenopteris amoena
 †Sphenopteris obtusiloba
 †Sphenosphaera
 †Sphenosphaera bilineatus – type locality for species
 †Sphenosphaera burginensis
 †Sphenosphaera capax
 †Sphenosphaera mohri
 †Sphenosphaera recurvus
 †Sphenosphaera rogersensis
 †Sphenosphaera troosti
  †Sphenothallus
 †Spicuchelodes
 †Spicuchelodes cressmani
  †Spirifer
 †Spirifer bifurcatus
 †Spirifer increbescens
 †Spirifer keokuk
 †Spirifer lateralis
 †Spirifer rockymontanus
 †Spirifer subaequalis
 †Spirifer tenuicostatus
 †Spirifer washingtonensis
 †Spiriferellina – tentative report
  †Spiriferina
 †Spiriferina subelliptica
 †Sporangites
 †Sporangites huronensis
 †Springericrinus
 †Springericrinus magniventrus
 †Stauropteris
 †Stauropteris biseriata
 †Stegacanthia
 †Stegocoelia
 †Stegocoelia kentuckiensis
 †Steloxylon
 †Steloxylon irvingense
 †Steloxylon santaecrucis
  †Stenaster
 †Stenaster obtusus – or unidentified comparable form
 †Stenomyelon
 †Stenomyelon muratum
 †Stenopora
 †Stenoscisma
 †Stenoscisma explanatum
 †Stephanozyga
 †Stephanozyga nodosa
 †Stereolasma
 †Stereolasma gallicalcar
 †Stereolasma rectum
 †Stereopteris
 †Stereopteris annularis
 †Stictopora
 †Stictopora neglecta
    †Stigmaria
 †Stigmaria ficoides
 †Stigmaria wedingtonensis
 †Stigmatella
 †Stigmatella conica – or unidentified comparable form
 †Stigmatella multispinosa
 †Stinocrinus
 †Stinocrinus granulosus
 Stomatopora
 †Stomatopora arachnoidea
 †Straparollus
 †Straparollus spergenensis
 †Streblochondria
 †Streblopteria
 †Streptelasma
 †Streptelasma angulatum
 †Streptelasma divaricans
 †Streptelasma obliquum
 †Streptelasma scoleciforme
 †Streptelasma subvesiculare – tentative report
 †Striatopora
 †Striatopora huronensis
 †Strobeus
 †Strobeus paludinaeformis – or unidentified comparable form
 †Stromatocerium
 †Stromatocerium huronense
 †Strombodes
 †Strombodes shumardi
   †Strophomena
 †Strophomena concordensis
 †Strophomena costellata – or unidentified comparable form
 †Strophomena maysvillensis
 †Strophomena musculosa – or unidentified comparable form
 †Strophomena neglecta
 †Strophomena planoconvexa
 †Strophomena planumbona
 †Strophomena sinuata
 †Strophomena sulcata
 †Strophostylus
 †Strophostylus chesterensis
 †Strophostylus wortheni
 †Subulites
 †Subulites parvus – type locality for species
 †Sulcoretepora
 †Sulcoretepora lineata
 †Synbathocrinus
 †Synbathocrinus angularis
 †Synbathocrinus dentatus
 †Synbathocrinus robustus
 †Synbathocrinus swallovi
 †Syringolites
 †Syringolites vesiculosus
  †Syringopora
 †Syringopora hisingeri
 †Syringopora monroensis
 †Syringopora perelegans

T

 †Tabulipora
 †Tabulipora cestriensis
 †Tabulipora penerudis
 †Tabulipora ramosa
 †Talarocrinus
 †Talarocrinus simplex
 †Tancrediopsis
 †Tancrediopsis cuneata
 †Tarphophragma
 †Tarphophragma multitabulata
  †Taxocrinus
 †Taxocrinus colletti
 †Taxocrinus pustulosus
 †Technophorus
 †Technophorus cincinnatiense
 †Technophorus faberi
 †Technophorus punctostriatus
 †Teichochilina – tentative report
 †Temnodiscus
 †Temnodiscus nitidula
 †Tetracamera
 †Tetracamera arctirostrata
 †Tetracamera grosvenori
 †Tetracamera mutata
 †Tetracamera subcuneata
 †Tetradium
 †Tetradium approximatum
 †Tetradium cellulosum – or unidentified comparable form
 †Tetranota
 †Tetranota obsoleta
 †Thamniscus
 †Thamnopora
 †Thamnopora limitaris
 †Thamnoptychia
 †Thamnoptychia alternans
 †Thamnoptychia vermiculosa
 †Thecia
 †Thecia minor
 †Theelia
 †Theelia hexacneme – type locality for species
 †Thinocrinus
 †Thinocrinus lowei
 †Thuroholia
 †Thuroholia croneisi
 †Thuroholia floydensis – type locality for species
 †Thuroholia irregularis – type locality for species
 †Thuroholia wanlessi – type locality for species
 †Toichochilina
 †Torynifer
 †Torynifer pseudolineatus
 †Torynifer setigera
 †Trematis
 †Trepospira
 †Trepospira depressa
 †Trepospira illinoisensis
  †Treptoceras
 †Treptoceras cincinnatiensis
 †Treptoceras duseri
 †Treptoceras transversum
    †Triarthrus
 †Triarthrus eatoni
 †Triboloporus
 †Triboloporus cryptoplicatus
 †Triendoceras – tentative report
 †Triendoceras davisi – type locality for species
 †Trigonocarpus
 †Trigonodictya
 †Trigonodictya acuta
 †Trocholites
 †Trocholites faberi
 †Trochonema
 †Trochonema canadensis
 †Trochonema subcrassum
 †Trochonemella
 †Trochonemella notablis
 †Trochophyllum
 †Tropidodiscus
 †Tryplasma
 †Tryplasma cylindrica
 †Tryplasma mitella
 †Tryplasma prava
 †Tryplasma radicula

U

 †Ulodendron
 †Ulodendron majus
 †Ulrichia
 †Ulrichia nodosa
  †Ulrichicrinus
 †Ulrichicrinus agnatus
 †Ulrichocystis
 †Ulrichocystis eximia
 †Undulabucania
 †Undulabucania punctifrons
 †Uperocrinus
 †Uperocrinus acuminatus – type locality for species
 †Uperocrinus nashvillae
 †Uperocrinus pyriformis
 †Uperocrinus robustus

V

 †Vaginoceras
 †Vallatotheca
 †Vallatotheca unguiformis
 †Vanuxemia
 †Vanuxemia dixonensis – or unidentified related form
 †Vanuxemia gibbosa
 †Vanuxemia nana – or unidentified comparable form
 †Vanuxemia sardesoni – or unidentified related form
 †Verrucosisporites
 †Verrucosisporites microtuberosus
 †Vestispora
 †Vestispora costata
 †Volsellina
 †Volsellina subelliptica
 †Vorticina
 †Vorticina anneae – type locality for species

W

 †Waagenella
 †Waagenella claxtonensis
 †Wachsmuthicrinus
 †Wachsmuthicrinus spinosulus
 †Wachsmuthicrinus spinulosus
 †Warthinia
 †Warthinia nodosa
 †Weissistachys
 †Weissistachys kentuckiensis
 †Wellergyi – type locality for genus
 †Wellergyi chesterensis
 †Whiteavesia
 †Wilsonites
 †Wilsonites circularis
 †Wilsonites vesicatus
 †Winchelloceras
 †Winchelloceras allei
 †Winchelloceras knappi – type locality for species
 †Worthenia
 †Worthenia tabulata
 †Worthenocrinus
 †Worthenocrinus hardinensis
 †Worthenopora

X

 †Xenocrinus
 †Xyeleblastus
 †Xyeleblastus magnificus

Z

 †Zadelsdorfia – tentative report
 †Zaphrenthis
 †Zaphrenthis amplexiformis – tentative report
 †Zygospira
 †Zygospira cincinnatiensis
 †Zygospira kentuckyensis
 †Zygospira lebanonensis
 †Zygospira modesta

References

 

Paleozoic
Life
Kentucky